Appenzell Railways (AB) is a Swiss railway company with headquarters in Herisau. It operates a network of railways in the cantons of Appenzell Innerrhoden, Appenzell Ausserrhoden, St. Gallen and Thurgau.

History 
The origins of the Appenzeller Bahnen company lies in a number of formerly independent companies and railway lines:

 The Rorschach–Heiden-Bergbahn (RHB), which opened its line from Rorschach to Heiden in 1875.
 The Appenzellerbahn (AB), which opened its line from Winkeln to Urnäsch via Herisau in 1875, with an extension from Urnäsch to Appenzell in 1886. In 1913, the line from Herisau to Winkeln was replaced by a new line to Gossau.
 The Frauenfeld–Wil railway (FW) in 1887
 The St. Gallen–Gais–Appenzell-Bahn (SGA), which opened between St. Gallen and Gais in 1889, and was extended to Appenzell in 1904.
 The Rheineck–Walzenhausen-Bergbahn (RhW), which opened between Rheineck and Walzenhausen in 1896.
 The Trogenerbahn (TB), which opened between St. Gallen and Trogen in 1903.
 The Altstätten-Gais-Bahn (AG), which opened between Gais and Altstätten in 1911.
 The Säntisbahn, which opened between Appenzell and Wasserauen in 1912.

The Appenzellerbahn and Santisbahn merged in 1947, retaining the Appenzellerbahn (AB) identity. The St. Gallen–Gais–Appenzell-Bahn and Altstätten-Gais-Bahn merged in 1948, under the name St. Gallen–Gais–Appenzell–Altstätten-Bahn (SGA).

The Appenzeller Bahnen company was formed in 1988, with the merger of the Appenzellerbahn and the St. Gallen–Gais–Appenzell–Altstätten-Bahn. In 2006, the Appenzeller Bahnen company merged with the Rorschach–Heiden-Bergbahn, the Rheineck–Walzenhausen-Bergbahn and the Trogenerbahn companies. In legal terms, this merger took the form of the Appenzeller Bahnen company acquiring the other companies.

In 2021 the company merged with Frauenfeld-Wil-Bahn AG, owner of the Frauenfeld–Wil line. The two companies had shared operations for years.

Operation 

Today, the company operates the following railway lines:

 Appenzell–St. Gallen–Trogen
 Gossau–Appenzell–Wasserauen
 Altstaetten–Gais
 Rheineck–Walzenhausen
 Rorschach–Heiden
 Frauenfeld–Wil

The St. Gallen–Gais–Appenzell, Gossau–Appenzell–Wasserauen and Altstätten–Gais lines form a connected network of  lines, all electrified at 1500 V DC.  Until 2018, the St. Gallen–Trogen line was also of metre gauge, but ran independently.

From 2016 to 2018, the Appenzellerbahnen undertook a large construction project to connect the Appenzell-St. Gallen and St. Gallen-Trogen lines.  The three points of incompatibility were electrification (the St. Gallen-Trogen line was 1000 V DC with a brief stretch at 600 V DC shared with the St. Gallen trolleybus system), different (but physically adjacent) termini in St. Gallen, and maximal grades (the rack railway approach to St. Gallen from Appenzell was too steep for adhesion-based St. Gallen-Trogen rolling stock).  So the new project re-electrified the St. Gallen-Trogen line at 1500 V DC and constructed a new tunnel through St. Gallen.  The old alignment through St. Gallen closed in April 2018, and the system began through-running in October of the same year.

The Rheineck–Walzenhausen and Rorschach–Heiden lines are geographically separate from the rest of the network, and are of respectively  and standard gauges. The Altstaetten–Gais, Rheineck–Walzenhausen and Rorschach–Heiden lines all have rack railway sections, whilst the Gossau–Appenzell–Wasserauen and Appenzell–St. Gallen–Trogen lines are adhesion only. Frauenfeld-Wil was cooperating closely, but legally distinct from 2003. It is not connected by tracks. 2021 they were taken over.

The company also operates a bus service from Teufen, on the St. Gallen–Gais–Appenzell line, to Speicher, on the St. Gallen–Trogen line. Night bus services are operated over the routes of the St. Gallen–Gais–Appenzell and St. Gallen–Trogen lines.

References

External links 
 
 Appenzeller Bahnen web site

 
Railway companies of Switzerland
Transport in Appenzell Ausserrhoden
Transport in Appenzell Innerrhoden
Transport in the canton of St. Gallen
Transport in Thurgau
Railway companies established in 1988
Swiss companies established in 1988